Theodore is a village in the Canadian province of Saskatchewan within the Rural Municipality of Insinger No. 275 and Census Division No. 9. Theodore is located on Saskatchewan Highway 16, the Yellowhead Highway, in southeastern Saskatchewan. The Theodore post office first opened in 1893 at the legal land description of Sec.1, Twp.28, R.7, W2. Theodore is located between Yorkton and Foam Lake.

With the end of passenger rail service in 1974, the Theodore railway station was adopted for use as a senior citizens' centre; it also serves as the home for the Theodore Historical Museum.

History 
Theodore incorporated as a village on July 5, 1907.

Demographics 

See also

List of communities in Saskatchewan
Theodore Reservoir

References

Villages in Saskatchewan
Insinger No. 275, Saskatchewan
Division No. 9, Saskatchewan